The 2020 Georgia Bulldogs softball team represents the University of Georgia in the 2020 NCAA Division I softball season. The Bulldogs play their home games at Turner Softball Stadium.

Previous season

The Bulldogs finished the 2019 season 42–19 overall, and 12–12 in the SEC to finish in a tie for sixth in the conference. The Bulldogs went 2–2 in the Minneapolis Regional during the  2019 NCAA Division I softball tournament.

Preseason

SEC preseason poll
The SEC preseason poll was released on January 15, 2020.

Schedule and results

Source:
*Rankings are based on the team's current ranking in the NFCA poll.

Rankings

References

Georgia
Georgia Bulldogs softball seasons
Georgia Bulldogs softball